Charles Cornish (1850 – 27 November 1917) was a New Zealand cricketer. He played in one first-class match for Wellington in 1874/75.

See also
 List of Wellington representative cricketers

References

External links
 

1850 births
1917 deaths
New Zealand cricketers
Wellington cricketers
Sportspeople from Windsor, Berkshire